Lists of mountains can be organized by continent and more specifically by country and province/state:

Africa
Highest mountain peaks of Africa
List of Ultras of Africa

Mountains of Africa by country
List of mountains in Algeria
List of mountains in Cape Verde
List of mountains in Ethiopia
List of mountains in Lesotho
List of mountains in São Tomé and Príncipe
List of mountains in South Africa
List of mountains in Swaziland

Asia
List of Himalayan peaks
List of Ultras of Central Asia
List of Ultras of the Himalayas
List of Ultras of the Karakoram and Hindu Kush
List of Ultras of Malay Archipelago
List of ultras of Northeast Asia
List of Ultras of Southeast Asia
List of Ultras of Tibet, East Asia and neighbouring areas
List of Ultras of West Asia

Mountains of Asia by country

List of mountains in Armenia
List of mountains in Bangladesh
List of mountains in Bhutan
List of mountains in Burma
List of mountains in China
List of mountains in Hong Kong
List of mountains in India
List of mountains in Iran
List of mountains in Japan
List of Ultras of Japan
100 Famous Japanese Mountains - The major summits in Japan selected by Kyūya Fukada
Three-thousanders (in Japan) -  The 21 major 3000 meter summits in Japan
List of mountains in Korea
List of mountains in Laos
List of mountains in Malaysia
List of mountains in Mongolia
List of mountains in Nepal
List of mountains in Pakistan
List of mountains in the Philippines
List of Ultras of the Philippines
List of Philippine provinces and regions by highest point
List of mountains in Russia
List of mountains in Saudi Arabia
List of mountains in Sri Lanka
List of mountains in Syria
List of mountains in Taiwan
List of mountains of Tajikistan
List of mountains in Thailand
List of mountains in Turkey
List of mountains in Turkmenistan
List of mountains in Uzbekistan

Antarctica
List of Ultras of Antarctica
List of mountains of East Antarctica
List of mountains of Wilkes Land
List of mountains of Enderby Land
List of mountains of Queen Maud Land
List of mountains of Mac. Robertson Land

Australasia and Oceania
List of highest mountains of Australasia
List of Ultras of Oceania

Mountains of Australasia and Oceania by country

List of mountains in Australia
List of mountains in the Australian Capital Territory
List of mountains of New South Wales
List of mountains of the Northern Territory
List of mountains of Queensland
List of mountains of South Australia
List of mountains of Tasmania
Highest mountains of Tasmania
List of mountains of Victoria
List of mountains of Western Australia
List of mountains of Guam
List of mountains of Hawaii
List of mountain peaks of Hawaii
List of highest mountains of New Guinea
List of mountains of New Zealand by height
List of mountains of the Northern Mariana Islands

Europe
List of European ultra-prominent peaks
Most isolated major summits of Europe

Mountains of Europe by range
List of mountains of the Alps
List of mountains of the Alps above 3000 m
List of mountains of the Alps (2500–2999 m)
List of mountains of the Alps (2000–2499 m)
List of Alpine peaks by prominence
List of Alpine four-thousanders
List of mountains of the Balkans
List of mountains of the Elbe Sandstone Mountains
List of mountains of the Harz
List of Pyrenean three-thousanders

Mountains of Europe by country

List of mountains in Albania
List of mountains in Armenia
List of mountains in Austria
List of mountains in Belgium
List of mountains in Bosnia and Herzegovina
List of mountains in Bulgaria
List of mountain peaks in Pirin
List of mountains in Croatia
List of mountains in the Czech Republic
List of hills and mountains in Denmark
List of mountains in the Faroe Islands
List of mountains in Finland
List of mountains in France
List of mountains in Germany
List of mountain and hill ranges in Germany
List of the highest mountains in the German states
in Baden-Württemberg
in Bavaria
in Berlin
in Brandenburg
in Hamburg
in Hesse
in Mecklenburg-Vorpommern
in Lower Saxony
in North Rhine-Westphalia
in Rhineland-Palatinate
in Saarland
in Saxony
in Saxony-Anhalt
in Schleswig-Holstein
in Thuringia
List of mountains in Greece
List of mountains in Georgia
List of mountains in Iceland
List of mountains in Ireland
List of mountains in Italy
List of mountains in Kosovo
List of mountains in Liechtenstein
List of mountains in Montenegro
List of mountains and hills in the Netherlands
List of mountains in North Macedonia
List of mountains in Norway
List of mountains in Poland
List of mountains in Romania
List of mountains in Serbia
List of mountains in Slovenia
List of mountains in Sweden
List of mountains in Switzerland
above 3000 m
highest
most isolated
accessible by public transport
named after people
by canton
Bern
Glarus
Graubünden
Nidwalden
Obwalden
Schwyz
St. Gallen
Ticino
Uri
Valais
Vaud
List of mountains in Turkey
List of mountains in the United Kingdom
List of mountains and hills of Saint Helena, Ascension and Tristan da Cunha
List of mountains in Ukraine

North America

List of the highest major summits of North America
List of the highest islands of North America
List of Ultras of North America
List of the major 100-kilometer summits of North America
List of extreme summits of North America
Lists of mountain ranges of North America

Greenland

List of the ultra-prominent summits of Greenland
List of mountain ranges of Greenland
List of mountains of Greenland

Canada

List of mountains of Canada
List of the highest major summits of Canada
List of the most prominent summits of Canada
List of the most isolated major summits of Canada
List of extreme summits of Canada
List of mountain ranges of Canada

Mountains of Canada by province or territory

List of mountains of Alberta
List of mountains of British Columbia
List of mountains of Manitoba
List of mountains of New Brunswick
List of mountains of Newfoundland and Labrador
List of mountains of the Northwest Territories
List of mountains of Nova Scotia
List of mountains of Nunavut
List of mountains of Ontario
List of mountains of Prince Edward Island
List of mountains of Quebec
List of mountain ranges of Quebec
List of mountains of Saskatchewan
List of mountains of Yukon

Rocky Mountains

List of the major 3000-meter summits of the Rocky Mountains
List of extreme summits of the Rocky Mountains
Canadian Rockies
List of mountains in the Canadian Rockies
Ranges of the Canadian Rockies

United States

List of mountains of the United States
List of the highest major summits of the United States
List of United States fourteeners
List of the most prominent summits of the United States
List of the most isolated major summits of the United States
List of extreme summits of the United States
List of mountain ranges of the United States

Mountains of the United States by state or district

List of hills of Alabama
List of mountains of Alaska
List of mountain peaks of Alaska
List of mountains of Arizona
List of mountain peaks of Arizona
List of mountains and hills of Arizona by height
List of mountain ranges of Arizona
List of mountains of Arkansas
List of mountains of California
List of mountain peaks of California
List of California fourteeners
List of mountain ranges of California
List of mountains of Colorado
List of mountain peaks of Colorado
List of the highest major summits of Colorado
List of the major 4000-meter summits of Colorado
List of Colorado fourteeners
List of the most prominent summits of Colorado
List of mountain ranges of Colorado
List of hills of Connecticut
List of hills of Delaware
List of hills of the District of Columbia
List of hills of Florida
List of mountains of Georgia
List of mountains in Georgia by elevation
List of mountains of Hawaii see also Oceania
List of mountain peaks of Hawaii
List of the ultra-prominent summits of Hawaii
List of mountains of Idaho
List of mountain peaks of Idaho
List of mountain ranges in Idaho
List of hills of Illinois
List of hills of Indiana
List of hills of Iowa
List of hills of Kansas
List of mountains of Kentucky
List of hills of Louisiana
List of mountains of Maine
List of mountains of Maine by elevation
List of mountains of Maryland
List of mountains in Maryland by region
List of mountains of Massachusetts
List of mountains in Massachusetts by elevation
List of hills of Michigan
List of mountains of Minnesota
List of hills of Mississippi
List of mountains of Missouri
List of mountain peaks of Missouri by elevation
List of mountains of Montana
Lists of mountains in Montana by county
List of mountain peaks of Montana
List of mountain ranges in Montana
List of hills of Nebraska
List of mountains of Nevada
List of mountain peaks of Nevada
List of mountain ranges of Nevada
List of mountains of New Hampshire
List of mountains of New Hampshire by elevation
List of hills of New Jersey
List of mountains of New Mexico
List of mountain peaks of New Mexico
List of mountain ranges of New Mexico
List of mountains of New York
List of mountains of New York by region
List of mountains of North Carolina
List of hills of North Dakota
List of hills of Ohio
List of mountains of Oklahoma
List of mountains of Oregon
List of mountain peaks of Oregon
List of mountain ranges of Oregon
List of mountains of Pennsylvania
List of hills of Rhode Island
List of hills of South Carolina
List of mountains of South Dakota
List of mountains in South Dakota by elevation
List of mountains of Tennessee
List of mountains of Texas
List of mountain peaks of Texas by elevation
List of mountains of Utah
List of mountain peaks of Utah
List of mountain ranges of Utah
List of mountains of Vermont
List of mountains of Vermont by elevation
List of mountains of Virginia
List of mountains in Virginia by region
List of mountains of Washington (state)
List of mountain peaks of Washington (state)
List of mountain ranges in Washington (state)
List of mountains of West Virginia
List of mountains of West Virginia by elevation
List of hills of Wisconsin
List of mountains of Wyoming
List of mountain peaks of Wyoming
List of mountain ranges in Wyoming

México

List of the ultra-prominent summits of Mexico
List of mountain ranges of Mexico

Central America

List of the ultra-prominent summits of Central America
List of mountain ranges of Central America

Mountains of Central America by country

List of mountains of Belize
List of mountains of Costa Rica
List of mountains of El Salvador
List of mountains of Guatemala
List of mountains of Honduras
List of mountains of Nicaragua
List of mountains of Panama

Caribbean

List of the ultra-prominent summits of the Caribbean
List of mountain ranges of the Caribbean

Mountains of the Caribbean by country

List of mountains of the British Virgin Islands
List of mountains of Cuba
List of mountains of Dominica
List of mountains of the Dominican Republic
List of mountains of Grenada
List of mountains of Guadeloupe
List of mountains of Haiti
List of mountains of Jamaica
List of mountains of Martinique
List of mountains of Puerto Rico
List of mountain ranges of Puerto Rico
List of mountains of Saint Kitts and Nevis
List of mountains of Saint Lucia
List of mountains of Saint Vincent and the Grenadines
List of mountains of Trinidad and Tobago
List of mountains of the United States Virgin Islands

South America
The standard list for the major peaks of the Andes is the list of 6000m peaks as first compiled by John Biggar in 1996 and listed in his Andes guidebook. This list currently stands at 102 peaks, with no known completers.
List of Ultras of South America
List of mountains in the Andes

Mountains of South America by country
List of mountains in Argentina
List of mountains in Bolivia
List of mountains in Brazil
List of mountains in Chile
List of mountains in Colombia
List of mountains in Ecuador
List of mountains in Peru

See also

Lists of highest points
Lists of volcanoes
List of tallest mountains in the Solar System

References

 
Mountains